Ilona Pál (born 21 October 1954) is a Hungarian former sprinter who competed in the 1980 Summer Olympics.

She is the current Hungarian record holder in the 400m race with a time of 51.50 seconds, set on 11 August 1980 in Budapest, Hungary.

References

1954 births
Living people
Hungarian female sprinters
Olympic athletes of Hungary
Athletes (track and field) at the 1980 Summer Olympics
Olympic female sprinters